The Penrice Stone Train was a limestone train in South Australia that operated from the Penrice Quarry near Angaston on the Barossa Valley line to Penrice Soda Products' soda ash factory in Osborne in Adelaide's north-western suburbs, and the co-located Readymix concrete batching plant.

History
The train commenced operating in November 1950, initially being operated by the South Australian Railways, and later by Australian National and Genesee & Wyoming Australia. It was notable as the last broad gauge freight service in South Australia. It ceased operating abruptly in June 2014 when Penrice Soda Products went into receivership and the Osborne factory closed. The last service was halted whilst loading and returned to Dry Creek to terminate. 

In its final 10 or so years, it was hauled solely by 700 and 830 class locomotives. It had previously been hauled by the Rx, 500, 700, 750, 900, 930, GM, CK and BL classes.

References

External links
Flickr gallery
Flickr gallery

Railway services introduced in 1950
Railway services discontinued in 2014
Rail transport in South Australia
Discontinued railway services in Australia